Felix Gisler is a Swiss para-alpine skier. He represented Switzerland in four Winter Paralympics: 1976, 1980, 1984 and 1988. In total, he won one gold medal and three silver medals.

He also competed in the Men's giant slalom for double-arm amputees event at disabled skiing, a demonstration sport during the 1984 Winter Olympics.

Achievements

See also 
 List of Paralympic medalists in alpine skiing

References 

Living people
Year of birth missing (living people)
Place of birth missing (living people)
Paralympic alpine skiers of Switzerland
Swiss amputees
Alpine skiers at the 1976 Winter Paralympics
Alpine skiers at the 1980 Winter Paralympics
Alpine skiers at the 1984 Winter Paralympics
Alpine skiers at the 1988 Winter Paralympics
Medalists at the 1976 Winter Paralympics
Medalists at the 1980 Winter Paralympics
Medalists at the 1984 Winter Paralympics
Paralympic gold medalists for Switzerland
Paralympic silver medalists for Switzerland
Paralympic medalists in alpine skiing